Trinidad is an elevated metro station on the Line 4 of the Santiago Metro, in Santiago, Chile. The side platforms and tracks are wrapped in a large elliptical cross section tube. The station has a mezzanine area below the tracks. The station was opened on 30 November 2005 as part of the inaugural section of the line between Vicente Valdés and Plaza de Puente Alto.

References

Santiago Metro stations
Railway stations opened in 2005
Santiago Metro Line 4